Nebraska is a state located in the Midwestern United States that is divided into 93 counties and contains 50 census-designated places (CDPs). All population data is based on the 2010 census.



Census-Designated Places

See also 
List of counties in Nebraska
List of unincorporated communities in Nebraska

References 

census-designated places